The 2022 European Marathon Cup was the 12th edition of the European Marathon Cup of athletics and were held in Munich, Germany on 15 August 2022, inside of the 2022 European Championships

The total time is calculated on the sum of the times of the first three athletes arrived at the finish line, but the medals are awarded to all the athletes who have concluded the race.

Results

References

External links
 EAA web site

European Marathon Cup
Marathon Cup
International athletics competitions hosted by Germany
Marathons in Germany
European
Marathon Cup
European Marathon Cup